The 1975 Giro d'Italia was the 58th edition of the Giro d'Italia, one of cycling's Grand Tours. The Giro began in Milan on 17 May, and Stage 12 occurred on 29 May with a stage from Chianciano Terme. The race finished at the Stelvio Pass on 7 June.

Stage 12
28 May 1975 — Chianciano Terme to Forte dei Marmi,

Stage 13
29 May 1975 — Forte dei Marmi to Forte dei Marmi,  (ITT)

Rest day	
30 May 1975

Stage 14
31 May 1975 — Il Ciocco to Il Ciocco,  (ITT)

Stage 15
1 June 1975 — Il Ciocco to Arenzano,

Stage 16
2 June 1975 — Arenzano to Orta San Giulio,

Stage 17a
3 June 1975 — Omegna to Pontoglio,

Stage 17b
3 June 1975 — Pontoglio to Monte Maddalena,

Stage 18
4 June 1975 — Brescia to Baselga di Piné,

Stage 19
5 June 1975 — Baselga di Piné to Pordenone,

Stage 20
6 June 1975 — Pordenone to Alleghe,

Stage 21
7 June 1975 — Alleghe to Passo dello Stelvio,

References

1975 Giro d'Italia
Giro d'Italia stages